Børge Bæth (26 January 1920 – 27 February 1981) was a Danish swimmer. He competed in the men's 100 metre backstroke at the 1936 Summer Olympics.

References

External links
 

1920 births
1981 deaths
Danish male backstroke swimmers
Olympic swimmers of Denmark
Swimmers at the 1936 Summer Olympics
Swimmers from Copenhagen